The Minturn Formation is a geologic formation in Colorado. It preserves fossils dating back to the Carboniferous period. Among the fossils preserved are of crinoids, spiriferid brachiopods, gastropods, and the spines and teeth of numerous sharks such as Petalodus

See also

 List of fossiliferous stratigraphic units in Colorado
 Paleontology in Colorado

References
 

Carboniferous Colorado